The Trenton Public Schools is a comprehensive community public school district, serving students in pre-kindergarten through twelfth grade from Trenton, in Mercer County, New Jersey, United States. The district is one of 31 former Abbott districts statewide that were established pursuant to the decision by the New Jersey Supreme Court in Abbott v. Burke which are now referred to as "SDA Districts" based on the requirement for the state to cover all costs for school building and renovation projects in these districts under the supervision of the New Jersey Schools Development Authority.
As of the 2018–19 school year, the district, comprised of 20 schools, had an enrollment of 14,500 students and 884.4 classroom teachers (on an FTE basis), for a student–teacher ratio of 16.4:1. The district was the sixth-largest in the state in 2022.

The district is classified by the New Jersey Department of Education as being in District Factor Group "A", the lowest of eight groupings. District Factor Groups organize districts statewide to allow comparison by common socioeconomic characteristics of the local districts. From lowest socioeconomic status to highest, the categories are A, B, CD, DE, FG, GH, I and J.

Awards and recognition
Washington Elementary School was recognized by Governor Jim McGreevey in 2003 as one of 25 schools selected statewide for the First Annual Governor's School of Excellence award.

Schools
Schools in the district (with 2018–19 enrollment data from the National Center for Education Statistics) are:

Elementary schools
Columbus Elementary School (371 students; in grades K-5)
Franklin Elementary School (405; K-5)
Grant Elementary School (571; PreK-5)
Gregory Elementary School (567; K-5)
Harrison Elementary School (221; PreK-5)
P.J. Hill Elementary School (800; PreK-5)
Jefferson Elementary School (434; K-5)
Dr. Martin Luther King Elementary School (775; K-5)
Mott Elementary School (426; K-5)
Parker Elementary School (531; K-5)
Robbins Elementary School (541; K-5)
Washington Elementary School (409; K-5)
Wilson Elementary School (498; PreK-5)

Middle schools
Grace A. Dunn Middle School (893; 6-8)
Hedgepeth-Williams Middle School (674; 6-8)
Joyce Kilmer Middle School (370; 6-8)
Luis Munoz Rivera Middle School (483; 6-8)

High schools
Trenton Ninth Grade Academy (707; 9)
Daylight/Twilight Alternative High School (443; 9-12)
Trenton Central High School (1,818; 9-12)

Administration
Core members of the district's administration are:
James Earle, Superintendent of Schools
Jayne S. Howard, Business Administrator / Board Secretary

Board of education
The district's board of education is comprised of seven members who set policy and oversee the fiscal and educational operation of the district through its administration. As a Type I school district, the board's trustees are appointed by the Mayor to serve three-year terms of office on a staggered basis, with either two or three members up for reappointment each year. Of the more than 600 school districts statewide, Trenton is one of 15 districts with appointed school boards. The board appoints a superintendent to oversee the district's day-to-day operations and a business administrator to supervise the business functions of the district.

See also 
 Hedgepeth and Williams v. Board of Education

References

External links
Trenton Public Schools

School Data for the Trenton Public Schools, National Center for Education Statistics

Education in Trenton, New Jersey
New Jersey Abbott Districts
New Jersey District Factor Group A
School districts in Mercer County, New Jersey